La Fare-les-Oliviers is a commune in the Bouches-du-Rhône department in the Provence-Alpes-Côte d'Azur region in Southern France. Located in the Aix-Marseille-Provence Metropolis, it had a population of 8,666 in 2018.

History
A locally-renowned castle, Castellas, was built in the 10th century. In the 18th century, a pavilion was built in the centre of the village.

Geography
La Fare-les-Oliviers is situated 20.6 km (12.8 mi) to the west-northwest of Aix-en-Provence and 12.5 km (7.7 mi) to the southeast of Salon-de-Provence.

Demographics

See also
Communes of the Bouches-du-Rhône department

References

External links 
 Official website

Communes of Bouches-du-Rhône
Bouches-du-Rhône communes articles needing translation from French Wikipedia